The year 1845 in architecture involved some significant architectural events and new buildings.

Events
 Two influential clergy houses for the Church of England are designed: the Rectory at Rampisham, Dorset, designed by Augustus Pugin (along with restoration of the church; completed 1847) and the Vicarage at Coalpit Heath in south Gloucestershire, designed by William Butterfield (along with his first new Anglican church, St Saviour's, consecrated October 9).

Buildings and structures

Buildings completed

 Trafalgar Square in London, designed by Charles Barry and John Nash is completed.
 Government House, Sydney in Australia, designed by Edward Blore, is completed and first occupied.
 Tolbooth Kirk, Edinburgh, designed by James Gillespie Graham and Augustus Pugin, is completed as a church and General Assembly hall (Victoria Hall) for the Church of Scotland.
 New St Mary and St Nicholas parish church in Wilton, Wiltshire, England, designed by Thomas Henry Wyatt and David Brandon, is completed at about this date.
 Praha Masarykovo nádraží, the first railway station in Prague, designed by Antonín Jüngling, is completed.
 Cambridge railway station in England is opened.
 Oundle and Wansford railway stations on Northampton and Peterborough Railway in England, designed by John William Livock, opened.

Awards
 Grand Prix de Rome, architecture: Félix Thomas.

Births

 August 17 – Gyula Pártos, Hungarian architect (died 1916)
 October 9 – Ferdinand Arnodin, French bridge engineer (died 1924)
 December 12 – Bruce Price, American architect (died 1903)

Deaths
 July 10 – Christian Frederik Hansen, Danish architect ("Denmark’s Palladio") (born 1756)
 July 12 – Friedrich Ludwig Persius, Prussian architect (born 1803)
 Fryderyk Bauman, Polish architect, sculptor and decorator (born 1765/70)

References

Architecture
Years in architecture
19th-century architecture